Johann Bayer (1572 – 7 March 1625) was a German lawyer and uranographer (celestial cartographer). He was born in Rain, Lower Bavaria, in 1572. At twenty, in 1592 he began his study of philosophy and law at the University of Ingolstadt, after which he moved to Augsburg to begin work as a lawyer, becoming legal adviser to the city council in 1612.

Bayer had several interests outside his work, including archaeology and mathematics. However, he is primarily known for his work in astronomy; particularly for his work on determining the positions of objects on the celestial sphere.  He remained unmarried and died in 1625.

Bayer's star atlas Uranometria Omnium Asterismorum ("Uranometry of all the asterisms") was first published in 1603 in Augsburg and dedicated to two prominent local citizens. This was the first atlas to cover the entire celestial sphere. It was based upon the work of Tycho Brahe and may have borrowed from Alessandro Piccolomini's 1540 star atlas, De le stelle fisse ("Of the fixed stars"), although Bayer included an additional 1,000 stars. The Uranometria introduced a new system of star designation which has become known as the Bayer designation. Bayer's atlas included twelve new constellations invented a few years earlier to fill in the far south of the night sky, which was unknown to ancient Greece and Rome.

The crater Bayer on the Moon is named after him.

Works

See also
Julius Schiller
Bayer designation

References

External links
Full digital facsimile, Linda Hall Library

1572 births
1625 deaths
People from Rain, Swabia
17th-century German astronomers
16th-century German astronomers